Mott Station is an unincorporated community in Jackson Township, Harrison County, Indiana.

History
Mott Station was founded in 1883. A post office was established in the community in 1888, and remained in operation until it was discontinued in 1897.

Geography

References

Unincorporated communities in Harrison County, Indiana
Unincorporated communities in Indiana
Louisville metropolitan area
Populated places established in 1883
1883 establishments in Indiana